Jono Owen (born 1 November 1986 in Hong Kong) is a rugby union player who plays for the  in Super Rugby. His playing position is prop. He made his debut in Super Rugby for the  during the 2011 Super Rugby season against the Cheetahs in Bloemfontein.

During the 2012 Super Rugby season, the Brumbies released him from his contract and he joined the Rebels on a short-term deal.

He plays for Auckland in the 2015 ITM Cup.

External links
Brumbies profile
itsrugby.co.uk profile

References

1986 births
New Zealand rugby union players
ACT Brumbies players
Melbourne Rebels players
Queensland Reds players
Counties Manukau rugby union players
FC Grenoble players
Auckland rugby union players
Rugby union props
People educated at St Aloysius' College (Sydney)
Living people
Expatriate rugby union players in France
New Zealand expatriate rugby union players
Expatriate rugby union players in Australia